Lara Mata Caudevilla (born 18 February 1993) is a Spanish footballer who plays as a defender for Villarreal.

Club career
Mata started her career at Aragonesa.

References

External links
Profile at La Liga

1993 births
Living people
Women's association football defenders
Spanish women's footballers
Footballers from Zaragoza
Zaragoza CFF players
Villarreal CF (women) players
Primera División (women) players
Segunda Federación (women) players